Another Country is the 29th studio album by British singer-songwriter Rod Stewart. It was released on 23 October 2015 through Capitol Records. It was produced by Stewart and Kevin Savigar.

Background 
Stewart released his twenty-eighth studio album, Time, in 2013. The album contained eleven songs written or co-written by Stewart. Commenting on Time, Stewart stated, "I've found that the only way to write songs is to be as personal and honest as possible, And when my last album was so well-received it gave me the confidence to keep on writing, and to examine and write about different things. It also gave me the freedom to experiment with different sounds like reggae, ska and Celtic melodies."

Writing and recording 
Stewart stated that "Batman Superman Spiderman" was written about bedtime stories that he would tell his youngest son, Aiden Patrick Stewart, about the three fictional superheroes. The album's title track, "Another Country" was inspired by Stewart's respect for the armed forces – a respect influenced by his birth occurring shortly before the end of the Second World War – and consequent musing on life in the armed forces, particularly regarding the emotions generated by being apart from loved ones.

Recording sessions for the album took place at Stewart's home, and were produced with Pro Tools.

Singles 
"Love Is" was released as the lead single from Another Country on 23 June 2015. In the United States, the single peaked at no. 37 on the Adult Contemporary chart. "Please" and "Way Back Home" were released as subsequent singles on 1 September and 16 October 2015 respectively.

Critical reception 

Another Country received mixed reviews from music critics. At Metacritic, which assigns a normalized rating out of 100 to reviews from mainstream critics, the album received an average score of 57, which indicates "mixed or average reviews", based on 10 reviews. Andy Gill from The Independent gave the album a mixed review, describing it as "warmly engaging at its best", but that the quality of music dips halfway through the track list, highlighting "Way Back Home" and "Batman Superman Spiderman" as the weakest songs. Jasper Rees from The Arts Desk also gave the album a mixed review, stating that "there is the odd misstep", criticizing the choice to include an excerpt from Winston Churchill's 'We shall fight on the beaches' speech in the outro of "Way Back Home". Hal Horowitz from American Songwriter was highly critical of the album, describing the music as "[ranging from] pedestrian to forced", "excessively sentimental" in parts, and "bland". Ludovic Hunter-Tilney from Financial Times said that "dreary acoustic blandishments and plodding Celtic rock, cut from similar cloth to his 2013 album Time, leave one mourning the roaring roustabout of old." Dawn Renton of The Falkirk Herald gave the album a positive review, noting that "there’s a cosy Celtic charm to Another Country that’s warmly engaging" and concluding that "the latest offering confirms that Rod can still deliver a top notch album ... he continues to show his range and talent and [it] is a rather pleasant surprise to anyone who was never much of a fan in the past."

Kirsty Hatcher of OK! Magazine praised the album as "romantic and charming," while Fiona Shepherd of The Scotsman was critical of the album's nostalgic nature, noting "The Drinking Song" as the only non nostalgic. Noting that song, she concluded, 'Could we have more time in the company of this Rod next time please?" Stephen Thomas Erlewine of AllMusic argued that "as goofy as these numbers are, there's also something appealing about them", stating that "He's not the man he was back in 1969, when his folk was simpler and hungrier, but he's not pretending to be." Owing to his global celebrity status, the new album has been noticed in India as well. While acknowledging the uniqueness of Rod's voice, the Daily Post newspaper has given it a mixed review calling the lyrics as 'cheesy' and 'hollow'. The paper, however, recommends the album if only for the nostalgia it evokes for Rod's earlier work. John Aizlewood of The London Evening Standard stated of the album that "the legendary singer rediscovers his twinkly-eyed charm as he continues his return to form."

The album was selected as the "Album of the Week" by both The Independent and The Times newspapers. Reviews of the album consistently praised Stewart's voice and/or vocal performance, even if the reviewer was critical of other aspects of the album.

Track listing 
All tracks produced by Rod Stewart and Kevin Savigar; except "Hold the Line" produced by Stewart, Savigar, RedOne, and TinyIsland.

Personnel 
 Rod Stewart – lead vocals
 Kevin Savigar – keyboards, programming, bass guitar (2), backing vocals (5)
 Chuck Kentis – keyboards (5, 9), programming (5, 9)
 Emerson Swinford – guitars (1, 2, 3, 5, 6, 7, 10, 11, 12), banjo (1), bass guitar (3, 5, 12), backing vocals (5), ukulele (11)
 Mike Severs – guitars (8) 
 Don Kirkpatrick – guitars (9)
 Conrad Korsch – bass guitar (1, 2, 6, 7, 8, 10, 11)
 Iggy Grimshaw – drums (1-11)
 Julia Thornton – tambourine (1, 3, 4)
 J'Anna Jacoby – violin (1, 5, 6, 11)
 Jimmy Roberts – saxophone (2, 4)
 Nick Lane – trombone (2)
 Anne King – trumpet (2, 6)
 Kimberly Johnson-Breaux – backing vocals (1, 3-6, 9, 10, 11), choir vocals (2, 7)
 Lucy Woodward – backing vocals (1, 3, 4, 6, 9, 10, 11), choir vocals (2)
 Keith Allen – choir vocals (2, 7)
 Traci Brown-Bailey – choir vocals (2)
 David Daughtry – choir vocals (2, 7)
 Tia Goodrich – choir vocals (2)
 Nikki Grier – choir vocals (2)
 Shatisha Lawson-Aponte – choir vocals (2)
 Jason Morales – choir vocals (2, 7)
 Di Reed – choir vocals (2), backing vocals (5)
 Nikki Leonti – backing vocals (3)
 Windy Wagner – backing vocals (3)
 Gavin Cady – backing vocals (5)
 Lionel Conway – backing vocals (5)
 Jim Cregan – backing vocals (5)
 Paul Freeman – backing vocals (5)
 James Harrold – backing vocals (5)
 Matt O'Connor – backing vocals (5)
 Alastair Stewart – backing vocals (5)
 Angela Fisher – choir vocals (7)
 Sharon McRae – choir vocals (7)
 Andre Washington – choir vocals (7)
 Geneen White – choir vocals (7)
 Winston Churchill – voiceover (7)
 Darryl Phinnessee – backing vocals (8)
 Will Wheaton – backing vocals (8)
 Fred White – backing vocals (8)

Production 
 Producers – Rod Stewart and Kevin Savigar
 A&R Administration – Lotus Donovan
 Engineered and Mixed by Kevin Savigar
 Mastered by Bernie Grundman at Bernie Grundman Mastering (Hollywood).
 Art Direction – Gavin Taylor and Nicole Franz
 Design – Gavin Taylor
 Photography – Penny Lancaster Stewart
 Additional Photography – Amber Sterling
 Management – Arnold Stiefel

Charts and certifications

Weekly charts

Year-end charts

Certifications

Release history

References

Capitol Records albums
Rod Stewart albums
2015 albums
Albums produced by Rod Stewart
Albums recorded in a home studio